Coconut Tree Hill is a lateritic headland in Mirissa, Sri Lanka located adjacent to the Indian Ocean. It is a popular tourist destination in the country and is located at a headland with a coconut plantation. Coconut Tree Hill, despite being located on privately owned lands, is one of the most Instagrammed locations in Sri Lanka. In 1881, Ernst Haeckel portrayed Mirissa "red cliffs" in the sunset in his book, A visit to Ceylon and described "they seem to burn like coal...". The hill has been recommended as a place to observe the sunrise for the tourists. The hill is located on the Mirissa beach which is contiguous to Weligama across the Weligama bay. Mirissa beach has been described as one of the "secret beaches" in the world.

2021 controversy
In 2021, a controversy arose after constructing a fence across the hill over the private land the hill is situated. Since the fence has been erected without prior approval from the Urban Development Authority and the Coast Conservation Department, the proprietor of the land was ordered to demolish the fence. After a social media outrage, then prime minister Mahinda Rajapaksa was made aware of the situation. The land area of the hill is about 400 perches of which 320 perches are owned by a Sri Lankan and the balance is owned by a foreigner. It is the Sri Lankan landowner who constructed the fence. Later, the hill was reopened for both local and foreign tourists.

See also
 List of beaches in Sri Lanka

References

Beaches of Sri Lanka
Landforms of Matara District
Headlands of Sri Lanka